Reginald Grey may refer to:
Reginald de Grey, 1st Baron Grey de Wilton (c. 1240–1308)
Reginald Grey, 2nd Baron Grey de Ruthyn (1322–1388)
Reginald Grey, 3rd Baron Grey de Ruthyn (1362–1440)
Reginald Grey, 5th Earl of Kent (1541–1573)

See also
Reginald Gray (disambiguation)